For Men Only is a 1967 British short sex comedy film which was the debut feature from Pete Walker who wrote, produced and directed the film. It was also known as I Like Birds.

Plot
Freddie Horne loves his job working for a trendy women’s fashion magazine, but his pretty blonde fiancée is getting jealous. To smooth things over Freddie takes a job with the Puritan Magazine Group, an organisation hell-bent on promoting moral reform and ‘family values’. However, the caddish chief executive Miles Fanthorpe is not all he seems. Fanthorpe’s country house is actually full of scantily-clad young women, and he is secretly publishing a girlie magazine!

Cast
 David Kernan as Freddie Horne
 Andrea Allen as Rosalie
 Derek Aylward as Miles Fanthorpe
 Tom Gill as Father
 Neville Whiting as Claude
 Mai Bacon as Mother
 Glyn Worsnip as Rudolph
 Joan Ingram as Esther
 John Cazabon as Lamphrey Gussett
 Apple Brook as Receptionist
 Gladys Dawson as Mrs. Whitely

Production

Music
The music was composed and conducted by Harry South who went on to compose three more films for Walker.

References

External Links

1967 films
British independent films
1960s exploitation films
Films directed by Pete Walker
1967 independent films
1960s English-language films
1960s British films